The Road Is Fine (French: La route est belle) is a 1930 French musical film directed by Robert Florey and starring Laurette Fleury, André Baugé and Léon Bary. As no French studios had been converted for sound film, it was shot at Elstree Studios in Britain.

Cast
 Laurette Fleury as Huguette Bouquet 
 André Baugé as Tony Landrin  
 Léon Bary as Comte Armand Hubert  
 Saturnin Fabre as M. Pique  
 Tonia Navar as Mme. Delaccarrier  
 Pierre Labry as Client de la guinguette  
 Pierre Athon as Marchand des quatre saisons  
 Mady Berry as Mme. Landrin  
 Dorothy Dickson as Dorothy Dickson  
 Serge Freddy-Karl as Jacquot  
 Léon Belières as Le fripier Samuel Ginsberg

References

Bibliography 
 Marshall, Bill. France and the Americas: Culture, Politics, and History. 2005.

External links 
 

French musical films
1930 films
1930s French-language films
Films directed by Robert Florey
Films shot at British International Pictures Studios
French black-and-white films
1930 musical films
Transitional sound films
1930s French films